Digital Learning Assets (DLAs) are any form of content and/or media that have been formatted into a binary source which include the right to use it for the purpose of "facilitating learning". DLAs are most commonly found in online learning such as academic coursework and corporate training.

References

Educational technology
Educational materials